Deuterogonia is a monotypic moth genus belonging to the family Oecophoridae described by Rebel in 1901. Its only species, Deuterogonia pudorina, was described by Wocke in 1857 as Gelechia pudorina.

The species is native to Eurasia.

References

Deuterogoniinae
Monotypic butterfly genera